Sobrerol is a mucolytic.

History
Sobrerol was discovered by Ascanio Sobrero as an oxidation product of terpenes. Later the oxidation and reduction reactions of chiral pinene lead also to several possible isomers of carvone (the corresponding cyclohexyl ketone dehydrated at the isopropyl) and sobrerol, making it possible to determine reaction mechanism and the structural properties of pinene and of other terpenes.

References

Expectorants
Tertiary alcohols
Cyclohexenes
Monoterpenes